Karl Broman is a professor at the University of Wisconsin–Madison (UWM) in the Biostatistics and Medical Informatics departments. He has been employed at UWM since 2007 and previously was employed at Johns Hopkins University from 1999 - 2007. Broman's original research focus was quantitative genetics, although he has also become known for his work on reproducible research. In 2016, Broman was named a Fellow of the American Statistical Association.

Research

Study of Bile Acids 
In 2019 Karl Broman and a group of researchers published a study which found genetic variants in mice that impacted the bile acid levels in their guts.

Broman's other highly-cited papers include:
 Broman, Karl W., et al. "Comprehensive human genetic maps: individual and sex-specific variation in recombination." The American Journal of Human Genetics 63.3 (1998): 861-869.
 Broman, Karl W., et al. "R/qtl: QTL mapping in experimental crosses." Bioinformatics 19.7 (2003): 889-890.
 Churchill, Gary A., et al. "The Collaborative Cross, a community resource for the genetic analysis of complex traits." Nature genetics 36.11 (2004): 1133.

Rstudio 
Karl Broman created an R (programming language) package called 'R/qtlcharts'. This package is designed to interactively create visualizations of genetic data in high dimensions.

References

Year of birth missing (living people)
Living people
Johns Hopkins University alumni
University of Wisconsin–Madison faculty
R (programming language) people